Kashmira Pardeshi is an Indian actress who primarily works in Tamil and Telugu language films. She made her acting debut with the Telugu film Nartanasala (2018), and Tamil with Sivappu Manjal Pachai (2019).

Personal life 
Pardeshi hails from a Marathi family. She went to school at St. Anne's School in Pune and went to college at Brihan Maharashtra College of Commerce. She studied fashion design at National Institute of Fashion Technology in Mumbai.

Career 
Pardeshi has acted in several commercials before she made her film debut with a Telugu film Nartanasala (2018), opposite Naga Shaurya. The film was a commercial failure at the box-office, but her performance in it earned her a role in the Hindi film Mission Mangal (2019), where she was cast as Vidya Balan and Sanjay Kapoor's daughter. The film was a major commercial success at the box-office. And same year She made her Marathi film debut with Ravi Jadhav's Rampaat. Director Sasi came across her advertisements and her performance in Nartanasala and signed her up for the Tamil film Sivappu Manjai Pachai, opposite G.V. Prakash Kumar. Pardeshi hired a Tamil tutor to help her prepare for the role. The film was an average hit at the box-office.

Her only release on 2021 was Rider, marking her debut in  Kannada cinema, opposite Nikhil Kumar. The film received generally positive reviews from critics and audience, and was a decent hit at the box-office.

In 2022, her first release was Anbarivu, opposite Hip Hop Tamizha. The film opt a theatrical release, and released directly via Disney+ Hotstar, with receiving mixed to positive reviews from critics. Anbarivu was declared as an commercially successful film on OTT platform. Her last release was Varalaru Mukkiyam, opposite Jiiva. The film received negative reviews from critics and audience, but Pardeshi's performance as a "Malayali girl" was appreciated, the film was a flop at the box-office.

In 2023, her first release was Vasantha Mullai, opposite Bobby Simha, the film received mixed reviews from critics and audience. Her second release was a Telugu film, Vinaro Bhagyamu Vishnu Katha, opposite Kiran Abbavaram. The film received mixed reviews from critics and audience alike upon its released, and was a successful at the box-office.

As of February 2023, Pardeshi is shooting for her upcoming films including a Tamil film Paramporul, alongside Sarath Kumar and Amitash Pradhan. And PT Sir, opposite Hip Hop Adhi, marking her second collobration with him after Anbarivu (2022).

Filmography

References

External links 

Indian film actresses
Actresses in Marathi cinema
Actresses in Tamil cinema
Actresses in Telugu cinema
Actresses in Hindi cinema
Actresses in Kannada cinema
Living people
21st-century Indian actresses
Marathi actors
Actresses from Mumbai
Actresses from Pune
Year of birth missing (living people)
Place of birth missing (living people)